Jane Osti (b. 1945 Tahlequah, Oklahoma) is a native Cherokee artist. She specializes in traditional Cherokee pottery with unique embellishments and designs. In 2005, Osti was one of the youngest Cherokee artists to be appointed as a Living Treasure by Cherokee Nation. Currently, Osti teaches and creates her own pottery in her studio in downtown Tahlequah.

Early life
Osti was born in the Rocky Ford area of Tahlequah. Osti's father started out as a miner and in the later half of his life he raised cattle and was a rancher. Her Cherokee mother died when she was 5 years old. Osti did not have much exposure to art until she lived alone. She participated in art class in fourth and fifth grade but did not have any other opportunities outside of that. Osti attended Oaks Mission High School.

Education
Osti was married and started a family and did not start college classes until she was 33, when she took classes at a community college in San Francisco. In 1985, Osti moved back to Tahlequah and took the rest of her classes at Northeastern State University. Osti finished her Bachelor of Arts in art in 1989 and continued on to her master's at NSU immediately after. She graduated with her Master's of Science in education in 1992.

Introduction into art
The classes that Osti took with professor Jerry Choate were influential for her later career as a 3-dimensional artist. After finishing her first pottery class and while taking a Cherokee history course, Osti decided to interview Anna Mitchell for a paper. Mitchell soon became Osti's teacher, mentor, and friend. During this time, Osti switched her focus from the 2-dimensional to the 3-dimensional and really fell in love with pottery.

Style and notable works
Osti's work draws from ancient Mississippian culture and prehistoric southeastern woodland. Osti specializes in coil and slab construction, stone polishing, as well as glazing, and raku-firing. The images typically convey abstract animals and landscape with symbols of celestial activity, protection, and endurance.

Awards and achievements
Osti has won awards at many exhibitions, including awards from:
 Santa Fe Indian Market 
 Five Civilized Tribes Museum
 Red Earth Indian Arts Festival

In 2005, Osti was one of the youngest Cherokee artists to be designated a Living Treasure by Cherokee Nation.

Her work, Tall squash pot, was acquired by the Smithsonian American Art Museum as part of the Renwick Gallery's 50th Anniversary Campaign.

References

Further reading

Oklahoma Native Artists Oral History Project -- OSU Library

1945 births
Living people
American women ceramists
Northeastern State University alumni
Cherokee Nation artists
Native American potters
Artists from Oklahoma
People from Tahlequah, Oklahoma
Native American women artists
Women potters
American ceramists
21st-century Native Americans
21st-century Native American women